Çayoba (known as Telman until 2015) is a village and municipality in the Astara Rayon of Azerbaijan.  It has a population of 1,224.

References 

Populated places in Astara District